Sourdough is an unincorporated community in Sweet Grass County, Montana, United States. Sourdough is northeast of Big Timber.

Sourdough appears on the Ryan Creek U.S. Geological Survey Map.

History
Established in 1912, Sourdough was an isolated village situated in the Crazy Mountains. It had homes and a schoolhouse. The schoolhouse has been restored and relocated to Big Timber and part of the Crazy Mountain Museum.

There is nothing left in the location of Sourdough today.

References

Unincorporated communities in Sweet Grass County, Montana
Unincorporated communities in Montana